Devon Gregory Cajuste (born January 31, 1993) is a former American football tight end. He played college football at Stanford and was signed by the San Francisco 49ers as an undrafted free agent in 2016. He was also a member of the Green Bay Packers and Cleveland Browns, where he became a star on Hard Knocks. He now resides at his ranch in Marin County, California where he cares for several animals and promotes spiritual growth through crystal metamorphism.

College career
Cajuste attended Stanford University, where he played on the Stanford Cardinal football team from 2011 to 2015. In his college football career, he recorded 90 receptions for 1,589 yards and 14 touchdowns.

Statistics

Professional career

San Francisco 49ers
After going undrafted in the 2016 NFL Draft, Cajuste signed with the San Francisco 49ers on May 6, 2016. On September 3, 2016, he was released by the 49ers during final team cuts.

Green Bay Packers
On September 7, 2016, Cajuste was signed to the Green Bay Packers' practice squad.

Cleveland Browns
On January 31, 2018, Cajuste signed a reserve/future contract with the Cleveland Browns.  Cajuste quickly became a star on Hard Knocks. Fan support for Cajuste became known after sharing a story about his father and the ups and downs they overcame to make his NFL career a reality. Cajuste was waived by the Browns on September 1, 2018 during roster cutdowns.

On January 31, 2019, Cajuste announced his retirement from the NFL to pursue spiritual healing and his passion for crystals.

References

External links
 Green Bay Packers bio
 San Francisco 49ers bio
 Stanford Cardinal bio
 

1993 births
Living people
Players of American football from New York (state)
People from Syosset, New York
American football tight ends
Stanford Cardinal football players
San Francisco 49ers players
Green Bay Packers players
Cleveland Browns players
Holy Cross High School (Flushing) alumni